Müsellim can refer to:

 Müsellim, Çamlıdere
 Müsellim, Yapraklı